Gerald Patrick Ryan (27 December 1895 – 4 October 1974) was an Australian rules footballer who played with South Melbourne in the VFL.

A full-forward originally from Middle Park, Ryan spent just two seasons at South Melbourne. He had a big impact in their 1918 premiership year, topping the club's goalkicking with 32 goals and kicking three in the Grand Final.

He subsequently played for North Sydney in the NSW Australian rules football competition.

References

Sources
Holmesby, Russell and Main, Jim (2007). The Encyclopedia of AFL Footballers. 7th ed. Melbourne: Bas Publishing.

External links
 
 

1895 births
Australian rules footballers from Victoria (Australia)
Sydney Swans players
Sydney Swans Premiership players
1974 deaths
One-time VFL/AFL Premiership players